Chicken Kiev, also known as chicken Kyiv, is a dish made of chicken fillet pounded and rolled around cold butter, then coated with egg and bread crumbs, and either fried or baked. Stuffed chicken breast is generally known in Russian and Ukrainian cuisines as côtelette de volaille. Since fillets are often referred to as suprêmes in professional cookery, the dish is also called suprême de volaille à la Kiev. Though it has disputed origins, the dish is particularly popular in the post-Soviet states, as well as in several other countries of the former Eastern Bloc, and in the English-speaking world.

History 
The history of this dish is not well documented, and various sources make claims about its origin. Since the 18th century, Russian chefs have adopted many techniques of French haute cuisine and combined them with the local culinary tradition. The adoption was furthered by the French chefs, such as Marie-Antoine Carême and Urbain Dubois, who were hired by Russian gentry. In particular, the use of high quality meat cuts, such as various cutlets, steaks, escalopes and suprêmes became widespread in the 19th century, and a number of original dishes involving such components were developed in Russia at that time.

Côtelette de volaille 

The French term de volaille mean "of poultry" and denotes almost exclusively chicken dishes in French cookbooks. The name côtelette de volaille means thus simply "chicken cutlet". Despite the original French name, the Russian recipe is unknown in French cuisine, where the term côtelette de volaille refers to chicken breasts in general and is used nearly synonymously with chicken filet or suprême. The French term also denotes a minced chicken cutlet-shaped patty. The general Russian term for chicken cutlets, kurinaya kotleta (куриная котлета), refers predominantly to such minced cutlets, whereas kotleta de-voliay is applied exclusively to the stuffed chicken breast dish. The latter name appears in the pre- and post-revolutionary Russian literature (in cookbooks as well as in fiction) since the beginning of the 20th century and is usually mentioned as a common restaurant dish.

It also points out that "the cutlets de volaille are made from whole chicken fillets, like the game cutlets à la Maréchale". The recipe is preceded by a similar one for "hazel grouse cutlets à la Maréchale" with a quenelle and truffle stuffing. Another Russian cookbook published at the same time gives basically identical recipes for côtelette de volaille and côtelette à la Maréchale and notes that the only difference between them is that the former are made of chicken while the latter are made of game, such as hazel grouse, blackcock, etc.

The term à la Maréchale ("marshal-style") denotes in French cookery tender pieces of meat, such as cutlets, escalopes, sweetbreads, or chicken breasts, which are treated à l'anglaise ("English-style"), i.e. coated with egg and breadcrumbs, and sautéed. Numerous recipes of such dishes, some of them with stuffings, are described in both Western and Russian cookbooks of the 19th century. Among the stuffed versions, one finds a recipe for a "fowl fillet à la Maréchale" stuffed with truffles and herbs in The Art of French Cuisine of the 19th Century (1847) by Marie-Antoine Carême, and a similar filet de poulets à la Maréchale with herbs and forcemeat in La cuisine classique (1868) by Urbain Dubois. Elena Molokhovets' A Gift to Young Housewives, the most successful Russian cookbook of the 19th century, has included since its first edition in 1861 an elaborate recipe for "hazel grouse à la Maréchale" stuffed with Madeira sauce, portobello mushrooms and truffles.

Pozharsky cutlet 

The main difference between the old time côtelette de volaille and the modern chicken Kiev is that the elaborate stuffings of the former are replaced by butter. The use of butter for chicken cutlets has been known in Russian cuisine at least since the invention of the Pozharsky cutlet in the first half of the 19th century. The Pozharsky cutlets are breaded ground chicken patties for which butter is added to minced meat. This results in an especially juicy and tender consistency. The dish was a widely appraised invention of 19th-century Russian cuisine, which was also adopted by French haute cuisine and subsequently by the international cuisine.

While the roots of chicken Kiev can thus be traced back to French haute cuisine and Russian cookery of the 19th century, the origin of the particular recipe known today as chicken Kiev remains disputed.

Individual attributions 
The Russian Tea Room Cookbook notes that chicken Kiev was "most likely ... a creation of the great French chef Carême at the Court of Alexander I." Marie-Antoine Carême spent just several months of the year 1818 in St. Petersburg, but made a profound impact on Russian cuisine in this short time. The reforms carried out by his followers introduced in particular various meat cuts into Russian cookery. The recipe of the Russian côtelette de volaille is not present in Carême's major work mentioned above, but his "fowl fillet à la Maréchale" could have served as the starting point for the further development of such dishes.

Some Russian sources attribute the creation of this dish (or of its precursor) to Nicolas Appert, French confectioner and chef, best known as the inventor of airtight food preservation. In contrast, common biographic sources for Appert do not mention this dish, and the origin of these claims is unclear.

Novo-Mikhailovsky cutlet 
Russian food historian William Pokhlyobkin claimed that chicken Kiev was invented in 1912 as Novo-Mikhailovskaya kotleta in а St. Petersburg Merchants' Club located near the Mikhailovsky palace, and was renamed kotleta po-kiyevski in 1947 by a Soviet restaurant. However, these claims collide with primary sources. The cookbook by Alexandrova-Ignatieva (including editions before and after 1912) describes indeed Novo-Mikhailovsky cutlets and mentions that they were invented in the club near the Mikhailovsky palace. However, in the provided recipe these cutlets are made from minced meat similarly to the Pozharsky cutlet, with the only difference being the meat pounded by a tenderizer until it gets minced. This allows one to remove tendons from the meat and results in a more tender consistency of the ground meat than after the use of a grinder. The author also remarks that not only breasts but also other parts of chicken can be prepared this way and added to the mixture of meat and butter.

The second claim of Pokhlyobkin's version is invalidated, as the references of chicken Kiev appeared in published sources much earlier, since the 1910s.

Modern chicken Kiev 

Oral tradition in Kyiv attributes the invention of the "cutlet de volaille Kiev-style" (kotłeta de-voljaj po-kyjivśky) to the restaurant of the Continental hotel in Kyiv in the beginning of the 20th century. A luxury hotel built in 1897 in the center of Kyiv, it was run until the Nazi German invasion of the Soviet Union in 1941. The building was then mined by the retreating Red Army and exploded when the German Army occupied Kyiv in September 1941. After the war, the building was rebuilt and has since then been used by the Kyiv Conservatory. According to the memoirs of contemporaries, Chicken Kiev was the signature dish of the hotel's restaurant.

An early reference of "Kiev cutlets from chicken or veal" is found in the Cookery Digest (1915), a collection of recipes which were published in the Moscow Journal for Housewives in 1913–1914. These were minced meat cutlets similar to the Pozharsky cutlets, but shaped like a croquette with a bar of cold butter placed in the middle. Like modern chicken Kiev, the croquettes were covered with egg and breadcrumbs and fried.

Later, "chicken cutlets Kiev-style" were listed in Apportionments for dinners, separate dishes and other products of public catering (1928) which served as a standard reference for Soviet catering establishments. The book also included other items for chicken cutlets, such as "cutlet de volaille" and "cutlet à la Maréchale". The book demanded renaming of many traditional restaurant dishes to replace the (mostly French-style) "bourgeois" names with simple "proletarian" forms. In particular, the "cutlet Kiev-style" had to be renamed into "chicken cutlet stuffed with butter". This program was not realised immediately (at least not completely), and its successor, The Directory of Apportionments for Catering (1940), published by the Soviet Ministry of Food Industry, still included the traditional names. In post-World War II publications of this directory and in other Soviet cookery books, such as Cookery (1955), the "Kiev-style" name was retained, but the terms de volaille and à la Maréchale were indeed dropped in favour of simple names such as "chicken cutlet stuffed with milk sauce", "chicken cutlet stuffed with liver" and "chicken cutlet stuffed with chicken quenelle and mushrooms". As a result of this policy, the names de volaille and à la Maréchale disappeared from menus of Soviet restaurants.

The "old-style" name "cutlet de volaille Kiev-style" was occasionally mentioned in some post-World War II Soviet fiction books. In particular, in a short story This Is Not Written In A Cookbook (1947) by Yevgeny Vorobyov, a Soviet soldier and a former chef in a Moscow noble hotel explains to his comrade in arms, that "cutlets de volaille are made for two tastes. There are cutlets de volaille Kiev-style and cutlets de volaille jardiniere."

The name  is used to this day for chicken Kiev in Poland.

Mentions of chicken Kiev are also found in US newspapers starting from 1937. The reports describe the Russian-style restaurant Yar in Chicago serving this dish. The restaurant existed until 1951 and was run by Vladimir Yaschenko, a former colonel of the imperial Russian army. It was styled after the famous eponymous Moscow restaurant and was frequented by celebrities of that time. After World War II, US newspapers mentioned chicken Kiev served in New York restaurants. Recipes for a "chicken cutlet à la Kiev" were published in The New York Times in 1946 and in Gourmet magazine in 1948.

Since the end of the 1940s or beginning of the 1950s, chicken Kiev became a standard fare in Soviet high class restaurants, in particular in the Intourist hotel chain serving foreign tourists. Tourist booklets warned the diners of the danger it presented to their clothing. At the same time the popularity of this dish grew in the US. According to Darra Goldstein chicken Kiev became "a symbol of Russian haute cuisine".

In response to the 2022 Russian invasion of Ukraine, supermarket chains in the United Kingdom, Australia, and Canada rebranded their versions of the dish to "chicken Kyiv" (in line with the general media shift from the Russian-derived name "Kiev" to "Kyiv") to show respect and support for Ukraine and Ukrainians.

Variants 
Chicken Kiev is made from a boned and skinned breast which is cut lengthwise, pounded and stuffed with butter. Western recipes usually call for garlic butter, while in Russian ones regular butter is used. Herbs (parsley and dill) can be added to the butter. In some American recipes butter is replaced by blue cheese. 

In the classical preparation of French côtelettes de volaille, the humerus bone of the wing is left attached. This also holds for their Russian versions and in particular for chicken Kiev. For serving, the bone is usually covered with a frilled paper napkin. However, industrially produced pure fillets are often used nowadays, and the cutlets are served without the bone. This is the usual way of serving chicken Kiev in the US. A spherically shaped version was developed by English chef Jesse Dunford Wood.

Convenience food 

In the middle of the 20th century, semi-processed ground meat cutlets were introduced in the USSR. Colloquially known as Mikoyan cutlets (named after Soviet politician Anastas Mikoyan), these were cheap pork or beef cutlet-shaped patties which resembled industrially produced American beef burgers. Some varieties bore names of well known Russian restaurant dishes but they had little in common with the original dishes. In particular, a variety of a pork patty was called "Kiev-style cutlet". Since the late Soviet times, "real" chicken Kiev cutlets have been offered in Russia as convenience food.

Introduced in Britain during 1979, chicken Kiev was Marks & Spencer company's first ready-made meal. It remains popular in the UK, being readily available in supermarkets and served in some restaurant chains. Due to its popularity, it is included in the UK inflation basket which is composed by the Office for National Statistics for calculations of the consumer price inflation indices. The wide popularity of chicken Kiev as a pre-packaged meal led to the term Kiev being applied to various stuffed chicken dishes, such as "leek-and-bacon Kiev" or "cheese-and-ham Kiev" (the same dish as chicken cordon bleu). Vegetarian Kievs were introduced in the UK in the 1990s, and are popular vegetarian convenience foods.

Similar dishes 
Among other dishes similar to chicken Kiev, the aforementioned chicken cordon bleu with a cheese and ham filling instead of butter is particularly popular in the West. The recipe of Karađorđeva šnicla, a Serbian breaded veal or pork cutlet, was inspired by chicken Kiev.

Cultural references 

Chicken Kiev is the name used by William Safire for a speech made in Kyiv during August 1991 by then-U.S. President George H. W. Bush cautioning Ukrainians against "suicidal nationalism".

In 2018 a bronze miniature sculpture of chicken Kiev was placed on Horodecki street in Kyiv, near the restaurant "Chicken Kyiv". The sculpture became the first of a set of such mini-sculptures depicting famous symbols of Kyiv placed throughout the city as part of an art project.

See also 
 Breaded cutlet
 List of chicken dishes
 List of Russian dishes

Notes

References

Sources 
  []
  []
 
  []
 
 
  [English translation: ]
 
 
 
  []
 
 
 
 
 
 
  []
 
  []
  []
 
 
 
 
 

 
  []
 
 
 
 
 
  []
 
 
  []
 
  []
 
 
  A Gift to Young Housewives, English translation: 
 
 
  []
  []
  []
  []
 
 
 
  []
 
 
 
 
 
  []
  
 
 
  []
 
 
 
 
 

Baked foods
Breaded cutlets
Foods featuring butter
Stuffed dishes
American chicken dishes
Russian chicken dishes
Ukrainian cuisine
Soviet cuisine